The  RMIT School of Health Sciences was an Australian tertiary education school within the College of Science Engineering and Health of the RMIT University.

See also
RMIT University

School of Health Sciences, RMIT